M.V. Kea (sometimes called the Seabus Kea) is a commercial passenger ferry that operates the busy New Zealand Devonport-Downtown Auckland express route for Fullers Ferries (Auckland's largest ferry operator). The Kea operates a regular service departing from Downtown Auckland every half-hour.

The Kea entered service in 1988 as the 14th ferry of the company.

The bridge area forms a third deck. Her distinctive design is similar to earlier Auckland ferries in that she is longitudinally symmetrical, effectively meaning that she can be driven both ways, so that no U-Turns at the starts or finishes of crossings have to be made. This enables the Kea to maintain a half-hourly express service between Downtown Auckland and Devonport.

In 2007, she was removed from the water and given a substantial overhaul in a shipyard in the Western Reclamation, including major work on both engines.

Fullers would also prefer to commission a second ferry for the Devonport service. However (as of 2007) the investment of around NZ$4.5 million for a duplicate of the Kea is considered too risky.

In 2006, the Kea was involved in a minor collision at the Auckland Ferry Terminal with the moored Starflyte, due to steering failure.

In February 2015, the Kea was again involved in a collision, this time at the Devonport Ferry Terminal. No other vessel was involved.

References

External links
 

Ferries of New Zealand
Public transport in Auckland